Cossina is the name for both a section and subsection of Ditrysian insects in the order containing both butterflies and moths having a dorsal heart vessel. The section named Cossina contains two subsections: one also named Cossina (containing mostly smaller moths in the superfamilies Castnioidea, Cossoidea and Tortricoidea) having pupae with dorsal spines; and subsection Bombycina (containing generally larger sized moths and butterflies in the superfamilies Bombycoidea, Calliduloidea, Cimelioidea, Drepanoidea, Geometroidea, Noctuoidea, Papilionoidea and Uranioidea) having spineless pupae.

See also
 Taxonomy of the Lepidoptera

Sources
 Capinera, John, editor (2008), Encyclopedia of Entomology, 2nd ed., Springer Verlag, New York.

References

Ditrysia
Taxa named by Edward Meyrick